A by-election was held for the New South Wales Legislative Assembly electorate of Mudgee on 2 January 1872 because of the resignation of Henry Stephen.

Dates

Results

Henry Stephen resigned.

See also
Electoral results for the district of Mudgee
List of New South Wales state by-elections

References

1872 elections in Australia
New South Wales state by-elections
1870s in New South Wales